Nikolay Dmitrievich Devyatkov (Vologda — 1 February 2001, Moscow) was a Soviet and Russian scientist and inventor of microwave vacuum tubes and medical equipment. Full Member of the USSR/Russian Academy of Sciences (1968; Corresponding Member from 1953). Professor of the Moscow Institute of Physics and Technology.

Most Devyatkov's scientific papers apply to a microwave vacuum tubes. He was an author of more than 250 scientific works and inventions. Nikolay Devyatkov is inventor of a reflex klystron (1939, with E. Daniltsev).

Biography

Nikolay Devyatkov worked in 54 years at the enterprise "Istok" in Fryazino, Moscow Oblast, in the head Soviet (now Russian) enterprise of microwave electronics, including 39 years he was Deputy Director for Science.

Nikolay Devyatkov organized the publication of the journal "Electronic Engineering. Series 1, "Microwave Electronic", the editorial board of which he headed since its release in 1950 until his death. He was the chief editor of the journal "Radio Engineering and Electronics".

Nikolay Devyatkov was never a member of the Communist Party of the Soviet Union.

The founder of Soviet and Russian medical electronics 
Although the main work of Nikolay Devyatkov were aimed at improving the country's defense, he also made a significant contribution to the development of medical instrumentation.

MM-wave Therapy 
Nikolay Devyatkov with colleagues developed the theoretical foundations of low-intensity millimeter waves therapy (MM-wave Therapy) also called Extremely High Frequency (EHF) Therapy. In the mid-1980s, under the guidance of Nikolay Devyatkov the company "Istok" (Fryazino, Moscow Oblast) has developed the first device for MM-wave therapy "Jav-1". The Committee on New Medical Technology of the Ministry of Health of the USSR recommended the "Jav-1" for serial production (1987) and included one in the National Register of medical devices. In late 1980 the "Istok" has been established mass serial production the "Jav-1". "Jav-1" was also produced in the company "Start", Penza. The "Istok" and "Start" don't produce the "Jav-1" now.

Microwave thermotherapy 
Nikolay Devyatkov, together with Eduard Gelvic, Vladimir Mazohin and others developed the theoretical framework and create an apparatus of the microwave thermotherapy (hyperthermia) operating local electromagnetic hyperthermia of malignant neoplasms. At present, this direction is actively developed and theoretical developments Devyatkov and his colleagues are embodied in manufactured today in the company "Istok" installation:
"Yachta-4M" for the local microwave thermotherapy of malignant neoplasms and diseases of the prostate
"Yachta-5" for the general and local microwave thermotherapy of malignant neoplasms.

Gastrointestinal and intraluminal pH-metry and manometry 
In 1969-1970, Devyatkov with his colleagues designed the world's first industrial model of pH probe, which measured the acidity of the two points of the gastrointestinal tract and apparatus for recording the pH. Also he created the original versions of pH-probes with 3, 4 and 5 sensors, intraoperation, endoscopic, children's pH-probes for different age groups, dentistry and gynecology pH-probes, as well as equipment, recording pH with multisensor pH-probes. With the direct participation Devyatkov the NPC "Istok" were organized serial production of the first in the USSR pH-probes for gastrointestinal pH-metry. Method of complex study of the functional state of the stomach and duodenum, providing simultaneous measurement of pressure and acidity in different parts of the gastrointestinal tract and is called at that time "ionomanometry" has been applied in medical practice since 1974. Under the guidance of Devyatkov was made probe with 4 pH sensors, and 4 plastic manometric catheters.

This area of his research has its modern development in the devices for diagnostic gastroenterology: esophageal pH monitoring, esophageal motility study, electrogastroenterography and other, that has brandname "Gastroscan" in Russia and are the main products of Fryazino company ZAO NPP «Istok-Sistema».

Other areas 
Devyatkov and his colleagues performed a series of pioneering work in the field of medical thermography, were developed the therapy and surgical lasers, electrodes for coagulation endovascular veins, xenon feeds "Yakhont" for the treatment of otolaryngology, dental and gynecological diseases, and others.

Awards
Devyatkov received the Stalin Prize (1949), the Lenin Prize (1965), the State Prize of the Russian Federation (2000) and the Hero of Socialist Labour (1969). He was also awarded two Orders of Lenin, Order of the October Revolution, two Orders of the Red Banner of Labour and an Order of the Red Star.

References

1907 births
2001 deaths
People from Vologda
Full Members of the Russian Academy of Sciences
Full Members of the USSR Academy of Sciences
Academic staff of the Moscow Institute of Physics and Technology
Peter the Great St. Petersburg Polytechnic University alumni
Academic staff of Moscow Power Engineering Institute
Heroes of Socialist Labour
Stalin Prize winners
Lenin Prize winners
Recipients of the Order "For Merit to the Fatherland", 4th class
Recipients of the Order of Lenin
Recipients of the Order of the Red Banner of Labour
Recipients of the Order of the Red Star
State Prize of the Russian Federation laureates
Russian electrical engineers
Soviet inventors